The Solo routine competition of the 2014 European Aquatics Championships was held on 13–17 August.

Results
The technical round was held at 09:00 on 13 August. The free round was held at 10:00 on 15 August. The final was held at 10:00 on 17 August.

Green denotes finalists

References

2014 European Aquatics Championships